Blue Dragon Children's Foundation (Blue Dragon) is a charitably funded non-governmental organization based in Hanoi, Vietnam. Its mission is to help children escape from crisis by offering a range of services including rescue from sex trafficking, forced labor, and slavery and the providing of shelter, education and employment.

History
The foundation was begun by an Australian school teacher, Michael Brosowski. By early 2003, Brosowski had quit his university job and opened The Big Room, a residence for six children. It was funded for its first year by a $5000 donation. In August 2004 in Bac Ninh province the "Stay in School" program was launched to try to help keep poor rural children in school.

In March 2004, Blue Dragon Children's Foundation was registered as an Incorporated Association in New South Wales in Australia and in September 2004, it was registered as an Independent Non-Government Organisation in Vietnam. In early 2005 Chung left Vietnam to study in the US, and Brosowski hired two full-time staff to replace him. With these two staff, a combined office and drop-in centre was opened in March of that year.

In 2007, Blue Dragon's work expanded to central Vietnam when it began assisting in the running of a government-run children's home in Hoi An.

In 2011, Brosowski was named one of that year's CNN Heroes, and in 2012 was made a member of the Order of Australia in recognition of his work defending the rights of Vietnamese children.

Blue Dragon's Chief Lawyer, Van Ta, was named by United States Secretary of State John Kerry as a Trafficking in Persons Hero in 2014, and the Trust Women Conference's Anti-Trafficking Hero in 2015.

Activities

Blue Dragon's goal is to rescue children from crisis situations in the short term and then get them into school, training and ultimately employment in the long term. To achieve this, the organisation offers a range of direct services. Accommodation is provided, or repair/refurbishment of their existing home if living conditions simply aren't suitable. Out-of-school tuition is provided to help children study. Books and stationery are given to those who can't afford them, and scholarships are provided both for children and tertiary students. Medical care and nutritional support are provided to those who need it.

See also
 Child poverty
 List of non-governmental organizations in Vietnam

References

External links
 BDCF official page

Organizations established in 2004
Children's charities based in Australia

Foreign charities operating in Vietnam

Child education organizations
Foundations based in Australia
Non-profit organisations based in New South Wales